is a Japanese actress and voice actress.

Filmography

Television animation
Sara in Dragon Quest (1990) 
Shigeru Fujiki, Sawai-san, Atsuko Nomura, Osada-kun in Chibi Maruko-chan (1990) 
Shizuko, Warsman (young) in Kinnikuman: Kinnikusei Oui Soudatsu-hen (1991) 
Fukuda-kun in Papuwa (1992)
Tsutomu's Mother in Neighborhood Story (1995)
Albert, Emma in Remi, Nobody's Girl (1996)
Hina, Miss Fathers' Day, Michael, and Belladonna, Woman Zombie, Zombie in One Piece (2001) 
Mercury's Mother in Full Metal Panic? Fumoffu (2003)
Oha Kuro Bettari in GeGeGe no Kitaro (2007) 
An in Saint Seiya Omega (2012) 

Unknown date
Shigeru Fujiki, Sawai, Atsuko Nomura in Chibi Maruko-chan TV 2 
Tessa in Red Earth
Joanie in Coji-Coji
Sara in Dragon Warrior
Baba in I'm Gonna Be An Angel
Ina-chan and Santa in Kingyo Chuuihou!
Nanako-sensei in Sally the Witch 2
Souko Shikatani in Muka Muka Paradise
Masa Smith in Porphy no Nagai Tabi
Yuina Himoo in Tokimeki Memorial 
Fur Gots in Other Life: Azure Dreams

Film Animation
Donbe in Dr. Slump & Arale-chan Ncha! Penguin Mura wa Hare no chi Hare (1993)
Miss Fathersday in One Piece: The Desert Princess and The Pirates: Adventure in Alabasta (2007)

Video games
Yuina Himoo in Tokimeki Memorial (1994)
Laura in D (video game) (1995)

Dubbing
Bill (Season 2-7), Annie (Season 1-8), Stephen Hatt (Season 1), Bridget Hatt (Season 5) and Mrs. Kyndley (Season 2) in Thomas & Friends (1990-2007) 
Annie and the Tumbleweed in Thomas and the Magic Railroad (2000)

References

External links
Official agency profile 

1963 births
Living people
Voice actresses from Osaka
Japanese voice actresses
Japanese video game actresses